Rene Naufahu (born May 1970) is a New Zealand actor, screenwriter and director.

Career
Naufahu is perhaps best known for being an original cast member of the New Zealand soap opera Shortland Street, playing paramedic Sam Aleni for the show's first four years. In the United States, he is better known for portraying various characters in the Power Rangers franchise, such as Emperor Grumm of Power Rangers S.P.D. and Mentor Ji from Power Rangers Samurai and Power Rangers Super Samurai.

In 2006, at the Air New Zealand Screen Awards, he won Best Performance by an Actor in a Supporting Role as Erasmus, in the Toa Fraser film No.2. The film won the Audience Award, World Cinema - Dramatic, after sellout screenings at the 2006 Sundance Film Festival.

In 2005, he co-wrote television drama The Market with Brett Ihaka and Matthew Grainger. He was also one of the show's directors, alongside Damon Fepulea'i and Geoff Cawthorn.

He attended the Amsterdam-based Binger Institute's Script Development program in 2003.

Naufahu's first feature film as director is crime thriller The Last Saint, which began filming in September 2013.

Criminal convictions 
On 1 September 2017, Naufahu pleaded guilty in Auckland's District Court to six charges of indecent assault.  The charges related to six women who attended private acting lessons conducted by Naufahu in Auckland between 2011 and 2013. In January 2018 he was sentenced to one year of home detention. Naufahu had an earlier conviction for common assault and wilful damage arising from an altercation in a Christchurch bar in 2001, for which he was fined by the court.

Filmography

Film

Television

References

External links
 

1970 births
Living people
Actors of Samoan descent
New Zealand sportspeople of Tongan descent
New Zealand people of Samoan descent
New Zealand male film actors
New Zealand male television actors
People convicted of indecent assault